The Monty Waterbury Cup is awarded annually in polo at the Meadowbrook Polo Club in Westbury, Long Island. The first match was in 1922. It is named after James Montaudevert Waterbury, Jr. In 1956, Herbie Pennell was the winner.

References

1922 establishments in New York (state)
Polo in the United States
Polo competitions in the United States